Viktória Kokas (born 15 November 1990 in Győr) is a Hungarian handballer, who retired from professional handball in 2015. Currently she plays at the second division, also she serves as the technical director of Mosonmagyaróvári KC SE.

References

External links 
 Career statistics on Worldhandball.com
 Profile on Kiskunhalasi NKSE Official Website

1990 births
Living people
Sportspeople from Győr
Hungarian female handball players
Győri Audi ETO KC players